John Utz may refer to:
 John Utz (coach), American football, baseball, and basketball coach
 John C. Utz, member of the Virginia House of Delegates